William Aiton (1731–1792) was a Scottish botanist.

William Aiton may also refer to:
 William Townsend Aiton (1766–1849), English botanist
 William Aiton (sheriff) (1760–1847), Scottish law agent